Cheez-It is a brand of cheese cracker manufactured by the Kellogg Company through its Sunshine Biscuits division. Approximately  , the rectangular crackers are made with wheat flour, vegetable oil, cheese, skim milk, salt, and spices.

Cheez-It crackers, commonly called Cheez-Its, were introduced in 1921 by the Green & Green Company, a manufacturer of snack crackers based in Dayton, Ohio, and were marketed using the tagline "A Baked Rarebit." Sunshine Biscuits acquired Green & Green in 1932. Sunshine Biscuits became a subsidiary of the Keebler Company in 1996. Keebler, in turn, was acquired by Kellogg in 2001.

Cracker
Cheez-It crackers are  rectangles, though they are often believed to be squares . Cheez-It crackers are made with actual cheese, and are marketed by Kellogg's as such.

Flavors and types 

There are a variety of Cheez-It flavors and products, including:

 Buffalo Wing
 Cheddar Jack
 Cheez-It Big (a larger cracker more suitable for garnishing or dipping)
 Cheese Pizza
 Chipotle Cheddar
 Duoz Sharp Cheddar & Parmesan
 Duoz Bacon & Cheddar
 Duoz Jalapeño & Cheddar Jack
 Extra Toasty
 Gripz "mighty tiny"
 Grooves Bold Cheddar
 Grooves Sharp White Cheddar
 Grooves Zesty Cheddar Ranch
 Grooves Scorchin' Hot Cheddar
 Hot & Spicy (without Tabasco sauce)
 Italian Four Cheese
 Mozzarella
 Original
 Pepper Jack
 Provolone (with real hickory smoke flavor added)
 Puff'd
 Queso Fundido
 Reduced Fat
 Reduced Fat White Cheddar
 Scrabble Junior
 Snack Mix
 Snack Mix Double Cheese
 Snack Mix Sweet & Salty
 Snap'd
 Snap'd Cheddar Sour Cream
 Snap'd Double Cheese
 Snap'd Jalapeño Jack
 Snap'd Barbecue
 White Cheddar
 Whole Grain
 Zingz Chipotle Cheddar
 Zingz Queso Fundido

Cheez-It Grooves is available in Canada as Cheez-It Crunch.

Discontinued

Former offerings include:

 Asiago
 Atomic Cheddar
 Baby Swiss
 Barbecue & Cheddar Snack Mix
 Cheesy Sour Cream & Onion
 Chili Cheese
 Colby
 Duoz Smoked Cheddar and Monterey Jack
 Duoz Zesty Queso and Cheddar Blanco
 Hot & Spicy (with Tabasco sauce)
 Hot & Spicy Grooves
 Nacho
 Parmesan & Garlic
 Romano
 Smoked Cheddar
 Snack Mix Sriracha
 Twists Buffalo Bleu

See also
 Cactus Bowl (Arizona), sponsored by Cheez-It in 2018 and 2019
 Cheez-It Bowl (Florida), sponsored by Cheez-It starting in 2020
 Citrus Bowl (Florida), sponsored by Cheez-It starting in 2022

References

External links

 
 

Brand name crackers
Cheese
History of Dayton, Ohio
Kellogg's brands
Products introduced in 1921